Justin A. Smith (March 20, 1818 Whitehall, Washington County, New York – December 30, 1879) was an American politician from New York.

Life
He married Eliza Ann Wainwright (1819–1891), and they had three children.

About 1844, he was Inspector of Boats on the Canals, at Whitehall. In 1849, he was employed by the Saratoga and Whitehall Railroad Company.

He was a member of the New York State Assembly (Washington Co., 2nd D.) in 1855.

He was a member of the New York State Senate (13th D.) in 1856 and 1857.

He and his wife were buried at the Boardman Cemetery in Whitehall.

Sources
The New York Civil List compiled by Franklin Benjamin Hough (pages 137, 145, 249 and 297; Weed, Parsons and Co., 1858)
The New York State Register (1843; pg. 329)
The New York State Register (1845; pg. 357)
Pen and Ink Portraits of the Senators, Assemblymen, and State Officers of New York by G. W. Bungay (1857; pg. 61)

External links

1818 births
1879 deaths
Members of the New York State Assembly
New York (state) state senators
New York (state) Know Nothings
19th-century American politicians
People from Whitehall, New York
19th-century American railroad executives